Hesar-e Bala (also Romanized as Ḩeşār-e Bālā and Hisār Bāla) is a village in Tarrud Rural District, in the Central District of Damavand County, Tehran Province, Iran. At the 2006 census, its population was 695, in 175 families.

References 

Populated places in Damavand County